Snow Dog is a 1950 American Northern film directed by Frank McDonald and starring Kirby Grant, Elena Verdugo and Rick Vallin. It was the third of a series of ten films featuring Grant as a Canadian Mountie.

Plot

Cast
 Kirby Grant as Corporal Rod McDonald – RCMP 
 Elena Verdugo as Andrée Blanchard  
 Rick Vallin as Louis Blanchard  
 Milburn Stone as Dr. F. J. McKenzie  
 Richard Karlan as Biroff  
 Jane Adrian as Red Feather  
 Hal Gerard as Henchman Antoine 
 Richard Avonde as Henchman Phillippe  
 Duke York as Henchman Duprez 
 Guy Zanette as Henchman Baptiste  
 Chinook as Chinook, Webb's Dog

See also
 Trail of the Yukon (1949)
 The Wolf Hunters (1949)
 Call of the Klondike (1950)
 Northwest Territory (1951)
 Yukon Manhunt (1951)
 Yukon Gold (1952)
 Fangs of the Arctic (1953)
 Northern Patrol (1953)
 Yukon Vengeance (1954)

References

Bibliography
 Drew, Bernard. Motion Picture Series and Sequels: A Reference Guide. Routledge, 2013.

External links
 

1950 films
1950 Western (genre) films
American Western (genre) films
American black-and-white films
Corporal Rod Webb (film series)
1950s English-language films
Films based on American novels
Films based on novels by James Oliver Curwood
Films directed by Frank McDonald
Films produced by Lindsley Parsons
Monogram Pictures films
Northern (genre) films
Royal Canadian Mounted Police in fiction
1950s American films